"Suezmax" is a naval architecture term for the largest ship measurements capable of transiting the Suez Canal in a laden condition, and is almost exclusively used in reference to tankers. The limiting factors are beam, draft, height (because of the Suez Canal Bridge), and length (even though the canal has no locks).

Description 

Suez Canal Authority produces tables of width and acceptable draft, which are subject to change.

The similar terms Panamax, Malaccamax, and Seawaymax are used for the largest ships capable of fitting through the Panama Canal, the Strait of Malacca and Saint Lawrence Seaway, respectively. The term "Chinamax" refers to vessels able to use a number of harbours while fully laden. "Capesize" refers to bulk carriers too big to pass through the Suez Canal—and needing to travel the Cape route around the Cape of Good Hope and Cape Agulhas—but recent dredging means many Capesize vessels can use the canal. Plans to deepen the draft to  could lead to a redefinition of the Suezmax specification, as happened to the Panamax specification after deepening and widening of the Panama Canal.

Container ships 
Vessels longer than 400 meters need permission from the Suez Canal Authority to transit the canal. As of 2020, the largest container ships in service all have a length of (close to) 400 meters, and a beam and draft that fit just within the limits of the canal. The ship Ever Given, which ran aground in the Suez Canal in 2021, has Suezmax size with 399.9 meters length and 58.8 meters beam.

See also 
 Panamax
 List of Panamax ports
 
 Malaccamax

References

External links 
Ship sizes

Ship types
Max, Suezmax
Tankers
Ship measurements